The 2016–17 Dynamo Moscow season was the 94th season in the club's history and its first ever below the top level of Russian or Soviet football. They are currently participating in the Russian National Football League and the Russian Cup.

Squad
As of 10 May 2017

Out on loan

Reserve squad

Competitions

Russian National Football League

Results by round

Matches

Russian Cup

Squad statistics

Appearances and goals

|-
|colspan="14"|Players away from the club on loan:

|-
|colspan="14"|Players who appeared for Dynamo Moscow but left during the season:

|}

Goal scorers

Disciplinary record

References

FC Dynamo Moscow seasons
Dynamo Moscow